Lexikos is a peer-reviewed academic journal in the field of lexicography, established in 1991. It is published by Bureau of the Woordeboek van die Afrikaanse Taal of the association the African Association for Lexicography. It became the official journal of the latter in 1996. It appears annually and publishes contributions in English, Afrikaans, Dutch, French and German (with abstracts in English). Since the retirement of Johan C.M.D. du Plessis in 2010, a team of three rotating editors was put in place. The team takes joint responsibility of each issue, with one member of the team being appointed as editor in chief annually. The current team members are Danie Prinsloo, Elsabé Taljard and Steve Ndinga-Koumba-Binza.

Aims and scope 
Being the only lexicographic journal in Africa, Lexikos aims at stimulating discussion among researchers both on the continent and in the other parts of the world. Its scope encompasses not only lexicography, but also its relations with other fields, such as computer science or general linguistics.

The journal publishes the following types of contributions:
 Research papers
 Contemplative articles, reflecting on existing research and theories
 Review articles and reviews
 Discussions of projects
 Lexiconotes - short articles concerning various practical problems and suggestions
 Lexicovaria - announcements and press releases aimed at practicing lexicographers
 Reports on workshops and conferences

Abstracting and indexing 
The journal is indexed in the following services:

 Arts and Humanities Citation Index
 Current Contents
 Journal Citation Reports, Social Sciences Edition
 Linguistic Bibliography
 Linguistics Abstracts Online
 Linguistics and Language Behavior Abstracts
 MLA International Bibliography
 R.R.K. Hartmann's Bibliography of Lexicography
 Scopus
 Social Sciences Citation Index
 Social Scisearch

See also
 Open access in South Africa

References

External links 
 
 African Association for Lexicography homepage

Lexicography journals
Annual journals
Publications established in 1991
Multilingual journals
1991 establishments in South Africa